Bykovo is a rural locality (a village) in Staronadezhdinsky Selsoviet, Blagoveshchensky District, Bashkortostan, Russia. The population was 44 as of 2010. There is 1 street.

Geography 
Bykovo is located 46 km northeast of Blagoveshchensk (the district's administrative centre) by road. Arkaul is the nearest rural locality.

References 

Rural localities in Blagoveshchensky District